Kuzupınarı is a quarter of the town Köprülü, Göle District, Ardahan Province, Turkey. Its population is 194 (2021).

References

Göle District